Jennifer George may refer to:

Jennifer George (playwright), American playwright, director and professor
Jennifer George (cyclist) (born 1983), British racing cyclist
Jennifer George (basketball) (born 1991), American-Jamaican basketball player